Dial 100 is a 1982 Bollywood film, directed by S. Ramanathan. It stars Vinod Mehra, Bindiya Goswami in lead roles and music by Bappi Lahiri.

Soundtrack

References

External links
 

Films directed by S. Ramanathan
Films scored by Bappi Lahiri
1982 films
1980s Hindi-language films